The Flying Missile is a 1950 black-and-white Cold War era Columbia Pictures film starring Glenn Ford and Viveca Lindfors. Made with the cooperation of the US Navy, it tells a fictionalized story of the then recently revealed story of the US Navy's first mounting and firing submarine-launched cruise missiles such as the Republic-Ford JB-2 Loon off the deck of submarines.

Plot
Decorated US Navy submarine commander Commander William Talbot's (Glenn Ford) boat USS Bluefin (actually ) is on manoeuvres with the goal of simulating sinking the aircraft carrier . Midway is carrying a US Senator to view the test firing of a V-2 rocket from its flight deck. Sighting the carrier, Bluefin attempts a simulated torpedo attack but is detected and "sunk" by a simulated depth charge attack from a destroyer.

After viewing the successful launching of the V-2 from the surface, Talbot attempts to convince his commanding officer that if his submarine had a guided missile his attack on the carrier would have been successful. His commander relays the information that the US Navy has been thinking of the same idea and sends the Bluefin and its crew to the Pacific Missile Test Center at Naval Air Station Point Mugu for a short period of training and familiarization. On the way to the base, Bluefin ruins a fishing net of Lars Hansen's (John Qualen) fleet, which fishes in the area when the US Navy is not testing their missiles.

The crew of Bluefin are impatient with the training course they must take and attempt to speed things up and gather their own equipment through "midnight supply" (theft), but run afoul of the tight security on the base. Talbot meets and unsuccessfully attempts to seduce the base commander's secretary Karin Hansen, a Danish emigre who is the niece of the still furious Captain Lars. Talbot does obtain from Karin the location of needed missile parts at an army base and obtains them for his trial launch.

The unorthodox procedures used so well in wartime cause tragedy to the couple; Karin loses her job for revealing information and Talbot's haste in launching a missile from his boat's deck results in his serious injury and the death of his friend Quartermaster "Fuss" Payne (Joe Sawyer). Talbot's depression leaves him not desiring to walk without braces and in danger of being medically discharged from the US Navy.

Karin snaps Talbot out of his whining self-pity to take command of Bluefin during  a military exercise deploying a submarine flotilla to attack a surface fleet. Talbot conceives the idea for the missile-carrying submarines to launch their missiles, but then have them successfully guided to the surface fleet by the nearer submarines originally earmarked for a torpedo attack.

Cast

 Glenn Ford as Cmdr. William A. Talbot
 Viveca Lindfors as Karin Hansen
 Henry O'Neill as RAdm. Thomas A. Scott
 Carl Benton Reid as Dr. Gates, USN
 Joe Sawyer as Quartermaster 'Fuss' Payne
 John Qualen as Lars Hansen
 Anthony Ross as Adm. Bradley
 Harry Shannon as Vice-Adm. Williams
 Ross Ford as Crewman Chuck Davis
 Zachary Charles as Crewman Mack
 Jerry Paris as Crewman Andy Mason
 Kenneth Tobey as Crewman Pete McElvoy
 Paul Harvey as Gen. Benton
 Richard Quine as Airman Hank Weber
 John Dehner as Lieutenant Commander

Production
The subject matter in The Flying Missile was considered restricted and no other contemporary film describing US Navy cruise missile development in the immediate postwar era had been produced. As indicated in the film's opening credits, on location photography on US naval bases, aircraft carriers, surface fleet ships and submarines took place with the "full cooperation" of the US Armed Forces. Both US Naval and US Army installations were made available.
 
Rear Admiral Thomas M. Dykers was the technical director on The Flying Missile. After a long and distinguished career in the US Navy as a submarine commander, Rear Admiral Dykers retired from the Office of the Chief of Naval Operations and moved to California in 1949. He worked as a technical advisor for the film industry, on films such as The Flying Missile (1950), Submarine Command (1951), and Torpedo Alley (1952).  He later produced and narrated the 1957–58 TV series The Silent Service.

References

Notes

Bibliography

 Ford, Peter. Glenn Ford: A Life (Wisconsin Film Studies). Madison, Wisconsin: University of Wisconsin Press, 2011. .

External links
 

1950 films
American black-and-white films
Submarine films
Columbia Pictures films
Films scored by George Duning
Films directed by Henry Levin
Seafaring films
American war drama films
1950s war drama films
1950s English-language films
Works about V-weapons
1950s American films